The three Charger-class destroyers were all ordered by the British Admiralty on 12 October 1893 and on completion in early 1896 they served with the Royal Navy until 1911.

As was typical for torpedo craft at the time, the Admiralty left detailed design to the builders, laying down only broad requirements.

These three ships - and the similar three Ardent Class destroyers (ordered from Thornycroft in the same week) - were the first TBDs to omit this fixed bow tube. They carried a complement of 2 officers and 48 ratings (comprising 20 deck department and 28 engine room compartment).

These three ships did not quite meet the speed requirement of 27 knots for which they were designed. In three-hour trials they averaged the following power (ihp) and speed:

Their original two locomotive boilers were very troublesome and in their first few years of service the three ships were out of commission most of the time, but these were replaced by four new water-tube boilers (from Thornycroft) in 1899/1900 at Earle's Shipbuilding yard at Kingston upon Hull. This replaced the original closely-spaced twin funnels by three widely-spaced funnels (with the middle funnel twice the size of the others, as it served two boilers), like the majority of the other destroyers of the 1893-1894 Programme, and the ships continued to provide good service - all serving in Home waters until 1911. They were then decommissioned and all three were sold in 1912 to be scrapped.

Vessels in class

See also
A-class destroyer (1913)

Notes

Bibliography

 

 
Destroyer classes
Ship classes of the Royal Navy